La Presta Asphalt Mine is a former asphalt mine in the Val-de-Travers region of the canton of Neuchâtel. The mine was exploited until 1986 and asphalt was exported in most of Europe and in the United States.

Today the mines are no longer in operation and are partially open to the public as a museum. A dedicated train station La Presta Mines d'asphalte, located near the mine, is served by regional trains. Steam trains operated by Vapeur Val-de-Travers also occasionally serve the station.

References

External link

Official website

Mines in Switzerland
Companies based in the canton of Neuchâtel
Tourist attractions in the canton of Neuchâtel